Roberto Alva (born 10 September 1951) is a Mexican fencer. He competed in the individual sabre event at the 1972 Summer Olympics, held in Germany.

References

External links
 

1951 births
Living people
Mexican male sabre fencers
Olympic fencers of Mexico
Fencers at the 1972 Summer Olympics